Airlines Tonga was an airline based in Nukualofa, Tonga. It operated services within Tonga and flights are operated on its behalf by Air Fiji.

History
The airline started operations in December 2005 as a joint venture partnership between Air Fiji (49%) and Tongan travel agency Teta Tours (51%). Airlines Tonga became the second domestic airline of Tonga after Peau Vavaʻu.

On August 23, 2008, Airlines Tonga ceased all activity indefinitely, citing its inability to meet rising fuel costs.

Destinations
Airlines Tonga operated services from Tongatapu to the following destinations:

 Vava'u
 Ha'apai
 'Eua

Fleet 
The airline operated the following aircraft:

 Harbin Y-12 Mark II twin engine turboprop aircraft
 Embraer EMB 110 Bandeirante twin engine turboprop aircraft

References

Airlines disestablished in 2008
Defunct airlines of Tonga
Airlines established in 2005
2005 establishments in Tonga